Deep Insanity is a Japanese mixed-media project created and produced by Square Enix and Ubisoft. It consists of a manga titled Deep Insanity: Nirvana that began serialization in Monthly Big Gangan in January 2020, a mobile and PC game titled Deep Insanity: Asylum, which was released on October 14, 2021, and an anime television series by Silver Link titled Deep Insanity: The Lost Child, which aired from October to December 2021.

Plot
The action takes place in a world where a large part of the population has fallen into comas due to the mysterious illness called "Randolph Syndrome" during the outbreak of World War III. The illness is revealed to come from deep under the South Pole in a place called "Asylum" which leads people to explore this new land to discover a cure for the disease or to find what treasure this new land holds.

The manga follows a boy who is immune to the condition and a trader living in Antarctica who journey into Asylum. The anime is set between the manga and video game storylines and follows the young recruit Shigure Daniel Kai who joins "Sleepers" in exploring Asylum which is inhabited by monsters called "Scarred" and human "Exiles", some of which have been affected by the Randolph Syndrome and are referred to as "Cultists". The video game is set during the time when 540 million people lie in comas from Randolph syndrome and involve the sole survivor of a massacre that took place at a medical facility.

Characters

Deep Insanity: Nirvana

The protagonist of the manga who is good at handling firearms and runs a store in Antarctica. She has a prosthetic right arm, so it can be used as a weapon.

A Sleeper who has a special resistance to Randolph Syndrome. While working on a hospital ship, he accidentally meets Yamada and together they go to Asylum in search of special items.

Deep Insanity: The Lost Child

New Sleeper recruit who hopes to become a hero. He is assigned to Antarctica Front Platoon 11 where his skilled marksmanship becomes an asset to the group.

Antarctica Front Platoon 11 Commander who wields a huge scythe-like weapon and who appears to have the ability to make time repeat.

Platoon 11 Executive Officer and leader in the field. He is the most experienced Sleeper on the team and is an excellent swordsman. He formerly dressed as a woman and was romantically involved with Hayden but is killed during a failed mission in the Abyss.

Platoon 11 Sleeper. Due to an accident, he has a prosthetic right arm and a brain injury which has left him with a complete lack of fear or the ability to feel pain.

Platoon 11 Sleeper. She has a prosthetic right leg and is an accomplished artist who is interested in manga and anime.

Platoon 11 Sanity Anchor after failing to meet the Sleeper entrance criteria. A former pop idol who was exploited and is embarrassed about her past.

Konron Enterprises Antarctic Branch Chief.

Ararat Strategic Commander.

Antarctic Branch Chief.

He works for an organization whose motives are unknown. He has a severe haircut with shaved sides and usually wears dark pointed tip sunglasses and is a former boyfriend of Leslie.

She has the appearance of a young girl and wears a garland of small flowers in her hair. She works for Hayden and commands two blue, vicious, rabbit-like animals, Kamezou and Usazou, which she carries in a backpack.

 A young Exile girl living in an oasis area of the Asylum. She is viewed by Exile Cultists as the "Child of God" with the power to end the world and becomes the target of various groups in Antarctica for their own objectives.

Deep Insanity: Asylum

Media

Manga
A manga series with story by Norimitsu Kaihō and Makoto Fukami and art by Etorouji Shiono titled Deep Insanity: Nirvana has been serialized in Square Enix's seinen manga magazine Monthly Big Gangan since January 24, 2020. The manga will end serialization on March 25, 2023. The first two tankōbon volumes of the manga were released on September 25, 2021.

Anime
An anime television series by Silver Link titled Deep Insanity: The Lost Child aired from October 13 to December 29, 2021, on Tokyo MX, MBS, BS11, TVA, and AT-X. Shin Oonuma directed the series, with Kento Shimoyama handling series' composition, Kazuyuki Yamayoshi designing the characters, and Mirai Kodai Gakudan composing the series' music. The opening theme is "Inochi no Tomoshibi" (Light of Life) by Konomi Suzuki while the ending theme is "Shinjuiro no Kakumei" (Pearl Gray Revolution) by Kashitarō Itō. Funimation licensed the series outside of Asia. Medialink licensed the series in Southeast Asia, South Asia, and Oceania minus Australia and New Zealand; they are streaming it on their Ani-One YouTube channel and Bilibili.

Game
A mobile and PC game titled Deep Insanity: Asylum was released on October 14, 2021, in Japan. The game is a free-to-play RPG genre title with in-app purchases. Game combat is skills-based, is done in “real time”, and features auto and high speed combat options. A preview of the game was released for Android phones on July 2, 2021, in Japan. The game ended service on October 31, 2022.

Social media
An interactive social media game depicting the account of a reporter trapped in a hospital during a disaster is assisted by other social media users who can help guide her to safety ran from July 9 to 30, 2021, on Twitter.

Notes

References

External links
 Project official website 
 

2021 video games
Action video games
Android (operating system) games
Crunchyroll anime
Gangan Comics manga
IOS games
Japan-exclusive video games
Japanese role-playing video games
Mobile games
Seinen manga
Silver Link
Square Enix franchises
Square Enix games
Taito games
Television series about World War III
Television series set in the future
Ubisoft franchises
Ubisoft games
Video games developed in Japan
Windows games
World War III video games